Faculty of Health Sciences and Physical Culture of Kazimierz Pułaski University of Technology and Humanities in Radom is a nursing school and one of eight divisions of Kazimierz Pułaski University of Technology and Humanities in Radom, Poland.

History of Institute
The faculty was established on 25 June 2009 by Senate of K. Pułaski Technical University of Radom as the Institute of Health. Since academic year 2009/2010 the institute was offering two undergraduate programs in nursing and physical therapy, both full-time and part-time studies. In 2010 part-time nursing transition studies were introduced (undergraduate studies for nurses and midwives who got secondary medical education). On 1 March 2012 the institute was transferred into Faculty of Health Sciences and Physical Culture.

Programs
 Nursing
 first cycle (full-time and part-time)
 transition studies (part-time)
 Physical therapy
 first cycle (full-time and part-time)
 second cycle (full-time and part-time)
 Physical education
 first cycle (full-time and part-time)

Administration
 Dean – Prof. Zbigniew Kotwica, M.D., Ph.D., D.S.
 Deputy Dean – Dr. Agnieszka Saracen, Ph.D.

Organization
 Department of Physical Therapy
 Department of Nursing
 Department of Physical Education

References

External links
 Official website of Institute

Nursing schools in Poland
Kazimierz Pułaski University of Technology and Humanities in Radom